Mareo is a comune (municipality) in South Tyrol in northern Italy, located about  northeast of Bolzano.

Geography

Mareo borders the following municipalities: Badia, Prags, Bruneck, Cortina d'Ampezzo, La Val, Lüsen, St. Lorenzen, San Martin de Tor and Olang.

Frazioni
The municipality of Mareo contains the frazioni (subdivisions, mainly villages and hamlets) Curt (Corte/Hof), Mantena, La Pli de Mareo, Pliscia (Plisa/Plaiken), Al Plan (San Vigilio/St. Vigil), Rina (Welschellen), and Longega (Zwischenwasser).

History

Coat of arms
The shield is parted quarterly: the first part represents the Tyrolean Eagle on argent; the second the insignia of Austria. The third shows the head's dog of argent, with an or collar on gules, which represents the arms of the Lords of Ros that in thirteenth century had a castle in the village. The fourth arms is a sable hound with a gules bone in the jaws on argent; it’s the coat of Pracken family, one of the oldest families in Tyrol, which had properties in the area. The emblem was adopted in 1969.

Society

Linguistic distribution
According to the 2011 census, 92.09% of the population speak Ladin, 5.02% Italian and 2.89% German as first language.

Demographic evolution

References

External links
(Ladin)  Homepage of the municipality

Municipalities of South Tyrol